Devon Wylie (born September 2, 1988) is a former American football wide receiver. He played college football at Fresno State. He was selected 107th overall, in the 4th round of the 2012 NFL Draft by the Kansas City Chiefs.

Early years
Wiley attended Granite Bay High School in Granite Bay, California.

College career
Wylie attended California State University, Fresno from 2007 to 2011. He finished his college career with 98 receptions for 1,327 yards and eight touchdowns.

Stats

Professional career

Kansas City Chiefs
Wylie was selected by the Kansas City Chiefs in the 4th round of the 2012 NFL Draft.

Wylie made the final roster for the Chiefs in 2012 and wore number 19.  But he played in only six regular-season games, catching 6 passes for 53 yards.  Wylie also was used occasionally as a kickoff and punt returner.  However, Wylie was released on September 1, 2013, prior to the 2013 regular season.

Arizona Cardinals
Wylie was signed to the Arizona Cardinals' practice squad on September 25, 2013.

Tennessee Titans
Wylie signed to the Tennessee Titans practice squad November 6, 2013.  After being promoted to the active roster, Wylie returned kickoffs and punts in two games with the Titans, but was released on November 26, 2013, after losing a fumble on a kickoff return in a loss to the Indianapolis Colts.

Seattle Seahawks
Wylie was signed to the Seattle Seahawks' practice squad on December 5, 2013. He was released on December 7, 2013.

San Francisco 49ers
Wylie signed to the San Francisco 49ers practice squad December 10, 2013. The 49ers waived Wylie on August 25, 2014.

St. Louis Rams
On October 21, 2014, Wylie was signed to the St. Louis Rams' practice squad. On December 30, 2014, he was signed a future contract. On August 4, 2015, he was waived.

Oakland Raiders
On August 18, 2015, Wylie was signed by the Oakland Raiders. On September 5, 2015, he was waived by the Raiders.

Atlanta Falcons
On October 27, 2015, Wylie was signed to the Atlanta Falcons' practice squad. On December 15, 2015, he was released from practice squad.

Toronto Argonauts
On April 21, 2016, Wylie signed with the Toronto Argonauts of the Canadian Football League. He was released on August 1, 2017.

References

External links
Toronto Argonauts bio
Fresno State Bulldogs bio

1988 births
Living people
American football wide receivers
Canadian football wide receivers
American football return specialists
American players of Canadian football
Fresno State Bulldogs football players
Kansas City Chiefs players
Arizona Cardinals players
Pittsburgh Steelers players
Tennessee Titans players
San Francisco 49ers players
St. Louis Rams players
Oakland Raiders players
Toronto Argonauts players
Players of American football from California
Sportspeople from Roseville, California
People from Granite Bay, California
Seattle Seahawks players